Dorothée Dorinville, stage name Mademoiselle Luzy (1747–1830), was a French stage actress. 

She was engaged at the Comédie-Française in 1764. She became a Sociétaires of the Comédie-Française in 1764. She retired in 1781. 

She was most known as a soubrette, but also performed tragedy, and acted as a singer and dancer. She was described as a serious and ambitious stage artist, and was a part of the movement that wished to introduce realistic stage costumes. She was imprisoned in 1771 after having broken the censure laws in a play by Imbert.

References

External links 
  Mademoiselle Luzy, Comédie-Française

1747 births
1830 deaths
18th-century French actresses
French stage actresses